"Lookin' for Love" is a song by Australian rock group, Johnny Diesel and the Injectors. The song was released as the band's fourth single from their debut album Johnny Diesel and the Injectors in June 1989 and peaked at 28 in Australia. 
The single was released to coincide with the band's first ever national headline tour throughout August 1989.

Track listing
 7" Single
 "Lookin' For Love" (3:29)	
 "Cut Back"  (3:05)

 12" / Vinyl 
 "Lookin' For Love" (3:29)	
 "Cut Back"  (3:05)
 "You Don't Know"

"Cut Back" was a bonus track on the British version of the album. 
"You Don't Know" was recorded in 1987 at Rhinoceros Recordings, Sydney NSW.

Charts
“Lookin' for Love” debuted at #32 in Australia in July 1989, before peaking at #28 the following month.

Weekly charts

Credits
 Producer, Engineer, Mixed By – Terry Manning
 Bass – Johnny "Tatt" Dalzell
 Drums – Yak Sherrit
 Guitar, Vocals – Johnny Diesel
 Saxophone, Backing Vocals – Bernie Bremond

External links

References

Chrysalis Records singles
1989 singles
1988 songs
Diesel (musician) songs
Songs written by Diesel (musician)
Song recordings produced by Terry Manning